Ronja Richardsdotter Stanley (formerly Gullichsen; born 9 November 1991), known by their stage names Ronya and New Ro, is a Finnish-British singer-songwriter.

Life and career 
Ronya was born in Siuntio, Finland. They came to the fore in 2011 with their single "Annoying", which was played at YleX radio station. Ronya signed a contract with Warner Music Finland in 2008 when they were 16 years old. Their debut album  was released on 13 June 2012.

Ronya released their second album Tides on 19 October 2015.

Ronya's father is British-born music producer . Ronya is a Swedish-speaking Finn.

Ronya is non-binary, and uses they/them pronouns.

References 

1991 births
Living people
People from Siuntio
Swedish-speaking Finns
Finnish people of British descent
Finnish people of Norwegian descent
21st-century Finnish singers
Non-binary singers
Finnish LGBT singers